"If You Feel the Funk" is the debut single from American singer La Toya Jackson.  It was released in 1980 on Polydor Records, and is from Jackson's self-titled debut album (1980). It was released in three versions, with "Are You Ready?", "Lovely Is She" and "Night Time Lover" on the B-side (all three were album tracks; "Night Time Lover" was later released as a single).

The single narrowly missed the U.S. Billboard Hot 100, peaking at number 101.  However, it peaked at number seventeen on Billboard'''s Disco Top 100 chart and number forty on the Billboard Hot Soul chart.  Outside the US, "If You Feel the Funk" reached #42 in Germany, #13 in the Netherlands, and #9 in Belgium.

Jackson performed "If You Feel the Funk" as well as "Are You Ready" on the November 8, 1980 episode of Soul Train. She performed "If You Feel the Funk" on the December 13, 1980 episode of American Bandstand. In Europe, the number was performed on the 13 December 1980 episode of Dutch program TopPop and on the 12 February 1981 episode of Musikladen''.

Charts

References

1980 debut singles
La Toya Jackson songs
1980 songs
Polydor Records singles